Walter Velpo Rankin (January 28, 1919 – November 7, 1993) was a professional football player in the National Football League. He played running back for five seasons for the Chicago Cardinals. During World War II, Rankin served in the United States Military. His name is located on the World War II Honor Roll, which shows NFL players who also fought in the war, at the Pro Football Hall of Fame. During the war, however, Rankin also played for "Card-Pitt" a team that was a temporary merger of the Cardinals and Pittsburgh Steelers. The teams merged due to the manning shortages associated with the war.

References

External links

1919 births
1993 deaths
People from Grady County, Oklahoma
Players of American football from Oklahoma
American military personnel of World War II
American football running backs
Texas Tech Red Raiders football players
Card-Pitt players
Chicago Cardinals players